There have been nine baronetcies created for persons with the surname Lloyd, three in the Baronetage of England, three in the Baronetage of Great Britain and three in the Baronetage of the United Kingdom. Two of the creations are extant as of 2010.

Lloyd baronets, of Yale (1647)

The Lloyd Baronetcy, of Yale in the County of Denbigh, was created in the Baronetage of England on 21 June 1647 for Evan Lloyd. The title became extinct on the death of the second Baronet in 1700.
Sir Evan Lloyd, 1st Baronet (–1663)
Sir Evan Lloyd, 2nd Baronet (–1700)

Lloyd baronets, of Garth (1661)

The Lloyd Baronetcy, of Garth in the County of Montgomery, was created in the Baronetage of England on 10 May 1661 for the merchant and politician Charles Lloyd. The third Baronet was High Sheriff of Montgomeryshire between 1706 and 1707. The title became extinct on his death in 1743.
Sir Charles Lloyd, 1st Baronet (died )
Sir Charles Lloyd, 2nd Baronet (died )
Sir Charles Lloyd, 3rd Baronet (died 1743)

Lloyd baronets, of Woking (1662)

The Lloyd Baronetcy, of Woking in the County of Surrey, was created in the Baronetage of England on 28 February 1662 for John Lloyd, Member of Parliament for Carmarthenshire. The title became extinct on the death of the second Baronet in 1674.
Sir John Lloyd, 1st Baronet (–1664)
Sir John Lloyd, 2nd Baronet (–1674)

Lloyd baronets, of Milfield (1708)
The Lloyd Baronetcy, of Milfield in the County of Cardigan, was created in the Baronetage of Great Britain on 1 April 1708 for Charles Lloyd, Member of Parliament for Cardigan. The title became extinct on the death of the third Baronet in 1750.
Sir Charles Lloyd, 1st Baronet (–1723)
Sir Charles Cornwallis Lloyd, 2nd Baronet (–1729)
Sir Lucius Christianus Lloyd, 3rd Baronet (–1750)

Lloyd baronets, of Peterwell (1763)
The Lloyd Baronetcy, of Peterwell in the County of Cardigan, was created in the Baronetage of Great Britain on 26 January 1763 for Herbert Lloyd, Member of Parliament for Cardigan. The title became extinct on his death in 1769.
Sir Herbert Lloyd, 1st Baronet (1719–1769)

Lloyd baronets, of Pengwerra (1778)
The Lloyd Baronetcy, of Pengwerra in the County of Flint, was created in the Baronetage of Great Britain on 29 August 1778. For more information on this creation, see Baron Mostyn.

Lloyd baronets, of Lancing (1831)
The Lloyd Baronetcy, of Lancing in the County of Sussex, was created in the Baronetage of the United Kingdom on 30 September 1831 for James Lloyd, previously Member of Parliament for James Lloyd. The title became extinct on his death in 1844.
Sir James Martin Lloyd, 1st Baronet (1762–1844)

Lloyd baronets, of Bronwydd (1863)

The Lloyd Baronetcy, of Bronwydd in the County of Cardigan, was created in the Baronetage of the United Kingdom on 21 January 1863 for the Welsh Liberal politician Thomas Lloyd. The title became extinct on the death of the second Baronet in 1933.
Sir Thomas Davies Lloyd (1820–1877)
Sir Marteine Owen Mowbray Lloyd, 2nd Baronet (1851–1933)

Lloyd baronets, of Rhu (1960)

The Lloyd Baronetcy, of Rhu in the County of Dunbarton, was created in the Baronetage of the United Kingdom on 23 July 1960 for the politician Sir Guy Lloyd.
Sir (Ernest) Guy Richard Lloyd, 1st Baronet (1890–1987)
Sir Richard Ernest Butler Lloyd, 2nd Baronet (1928–2022)
Sir Richard Timothy Butler Lloyd, 3rd Baronet (born 1956)
The heir apparent is the baronet's son, Sebastian George Butler Lloyd (born 1996)

Notes

References
Kidd, Charles, Williamson, David (editors). Debrett's Peerage and Baronetage (1990 edition). New York: St Martin's Press, 1990, 

Leslie Baker-Jones. The Wolf and the Boar. Llandysul, 2005.
Thomas Lloyd. Lost Houses of Wales.

Baronetcies in the Baronetage of Great Britain
Baronetcies in the Baronetage of the United Kingdom
Extinct baronetcies in the Baronetage of England
Extinct baronetcies in the Baronetage of Great Britain
Extinct baronetcies in the Baronetage of the United Kingdom
Baronetcies created with special remainders